Ernest Michael McSorley (September 29, 1912, – November 10, 1975) was the last captain of the ill-fated laker-type freighter SS Edmund Fitzgerald. He died along with the other 28 members of his crew when the ship sank in Lake Superior on 

A Canadian by birth, McSorley wanted to be a captain. At age 11 in 1924, he moved to the United States with his father and stepmother and spent his teenage years in the St. Lawrence River town of Ogdensburg, New York. A veteran mariner, McSorley had over 40 years of experience on the Great Lakes and oceans. He assumed command of the Fitzgerald at the start of the 1972 shipping season and had commanded nine ships before joining the Fitzgerald crew.

A quiet man, McSorley was well respected by his contemporaries as a skillful master and by his men, whom he treated as professionals. He turned 63 a month and a half before the Fitzgerald incident and intended to retire at the end of the shipping season. His last known words were, "We are holding our own." Despite his death in a storm, he was respected throughout his career as a superb heavy-weather captain.

McSorley resided in the Toledo suburb of Ottawa Hills, Ohio, and was married to the former Nellie Pollock, an Illinois native. Although he had no children of his own, Nellie was the mother of three children from a previous marriage. Nellie, who was in ill health at the time of her husband's death, survived for another 17 years, dying at age 82 on February 13, 1993.

References

External links
Edmund Fitzgerald Online – Ernest McSorley
 

1912 births
1975 deaths
Canadian sailors
American sailors
People from Ottawa Hills, Ohio
People from Ogdensburg, New York
Deaths due to shipwreck
Canadian emigrants to the United States
Captains who went down with the ship